Puerto Rico FC was a professional football club based in Bayamón, Puerto Rico. Founded in 2015, the team played in the North American Soccer League (NASL), the second tier of the American soccer pyramid. The team debuted in the 2016 fall season. The team played its home games at the Juan Ramón Loubriel Stadium until the stadium was severely damaged by Hurricane Maria in September 2017. The team last played during the 2017 NASL season.

History 
In June 2015, National Basketball Association (NBA) star Carmelo Anthony announced that he is bringing football back to Puerto Rico with a new North American Soccer League expansion franchise. The announcement took place in Bayamon, Puerto Rico; the future home base of Puerto Rico FC, scheduled to begin its first season at Juan Ramon Loubriel Stadium in the 2016 fall season.

2016 season

On August 14, 2015, Adrian Whitbread was announced as the club's inaugural coach, with Thomas Payne being appointed as president on November 10, 2015.

North American Soccer League season
Puerto Rico FC made their home debut on July 2, 2016 at Juan Ramón Loubriel Stadium, drawing 1–1 to Indy Eleven, in front of a crowd of 6,474. Hector Ramos scored the team's first ever league goal in the 74th minute. Their first victory came against Rayo OKC on July 23, 2016, winning 1–0. They won 4 of their last 7 games to move up from 12th place to 9th, and ended their Fall season with 24 points finishing with a 5–9–8 record.

Puerto Rican international player; Hector Ramos led the team in scoring with 8 goals.

2017 season

On January 26, CONCACAF announced PRFC would host group D in the 2017 CFU Club Championship at Juan Ramón Loubriel Stadium starting March 14.

CFU Club Championship
Their first match in the tournament came against S.V. Transvaal of Suriname; whom they beat 1–0, thanks to Hector Ramos hitting the penalty shot in the 28th minute. The second match up came against Portmore United of Jamaica. They lost 1–0 late in the 88th minute. Shortly before the start of third match, Puerto Rico was eliminated from the tournament due to Portmore United finishing the group stage with three wins from games. PRFC played well defeating Scholars International SC of the Cayman Islands 4–0; with goals coming from debuted Mike Ramos, Sidney Rivera, Brian Bement, Cristiano Dias.

Puerto Rico finished the tournament 2–0–1.

North American Soccer League season
On May 19, 2017; Puerto Rico FC announced that Adrian Whitbread had been relieved of coaching duties and Neil Sillett as technical director; Marco Velez was named as interim Head Coach.

Tom Payne decided to leave the club at the end of November 2017, rather than renew his contract.

Cancellation of 2018 season and hiatus
On February 27, 2018, the NASL announced that it had cancelled its upcoming 2018 season, with hopes to return for a 2019 season.  While some other NASL clubs decided to join other leagues, Puerto Rico FC has not played since.

Head coach Marco Velez took a job with the Puerto Rico national football team before moving on to coach the Puerto Rico national under-17 football team.

Crest and colors
The team's colors are orange and white.

Kit evolution
Home and away kits.

Home

Away

Sponsorship
The official kit provider for the club in their first season was Nike.

Stadium 

Puerto Rico FC played their home matches at the renovated Juan Ramón Loubriel Stadium located in Bayamón. 10 miles from the capital city of San Juan, The "JRL", as it is now known, was originally a baseball stadium scheduled for demolition, and in 2003, it was converted into a football stadium for the Islanders. Until it was damaged by Hurricane Maria, the 22,000-seater stadium also served as the home to all levels of the Puerto Rico national football team as well as the Bayamon' affiliate team in the Puerto Rico Soccer League, Bayamón FC.

Club culture

Supporters 
Puerto Rico FC has two supporters' groups: La Barra Naranja and the United States-based group La Legión Extranjera. Puerto Rico FC supporters' groups were founded during the times of the Puerto Rico Islanders.

Rivalries 
The club's main rivalry is the New York Cosmos, when the club announced a PR/NY Derby for the first game of the 2017 season. The Oranges currently have a record of 0 wins, 4 losses, and 1 tie against their New York rivals.

Broadcasting 
On June 29, 2016, Puerto Rico FC signed an exclusive deal with local television channel WAPA TV. Puerto Rico FC home and away matches are televised on WAPA 2 Deportes.

Players and staff

Current roster
Following the announcement by the NASL that there would be no 2018 season, the players were advised by Puerto Rico FC to look for playing opportunities beyond Puerto Rico.

Technical staff

Executive staff

Honors

Domestic
 Copa Luis Villarejo
 Winners: 2016
 Bayamon City Cup
 Winners: 2017

Records

Year-by-year

Top goalscorers

Captains
Only captains in competitive matches are included.
Players marked in bold are still playing in the team.

Managerial record
Information correct as of match played August 31, 2017. Only competitive matches are counted.

Notes:

References

External links
 

 
2015 establishments in Puerto Rico
Association football clubs established in 2015
Association football clubs disestablished in 2017
Football clubs in Puerto Rico
North American Soccer League teams
Expatriated football clubs
Bayamón, Puerto Rico
2017 disestablishments in Puerto Rico